Holly Hoffman (née Wanner; born March 15, 1966), is an American author, motivational speaker, and television personality.  She is best known for competing on the reality competition show Survivor, and for her book Your Winner Within.

Early life
Holly Wanner was born in Eureka, South Dakota, the youngest of three children.  Her parents owned a grocery store, and as Wanner got older, she would spend her after-school time helping out at the store.  Her life at home was more turbulent, though; as an adult, she would come to describe her childhood home life as having been "abusive."  Her father, an alcoholic, left the family when Wanner was in sixth grade.  After her parents' divorce, she and her two older brothers were forced to get jobs to support the family.  Her father died in 1990 at the age of 46.

When Wanner got to high school, she became a star athlete in track.  In 1982, she set the Eureka High School record in the 300-meter hurdles; the following year, she set the school record in the 100-meter hurdles.  In 1984, the South Dakota Sportswriters Association named her the state's High School Girls Athlete of the Year.

After graduating high school, Wanner enrolled at Northern State University in nearby Aberdeen.  There, she met a fellow student named Charlie Hoffman.   They married in 1985.

Career
After their wedding, Holly Hoffman, along with her husband Charlie, established a cattle ranch outside Eureka, which she would help to manage even while still attending college and raising a family.  In 1993, she founded a swim team in Eureka, which she would coach for 17 years.  She was named Coach of the Year twice during her tenure.  In addition, she has also worked as a high school volleyball referee.

Family
Hoffman's husband Charlie is a former Majority Whip in the South Dakota House of Representatives.  From 2009 to 2015, he served three terms (of two years each) as a Republican representative in South Dakota’s 23rd legislative district.

Hoffman's oldest child and only son, Austin Hoffman, is a State's Attorney. Hoffman's second child and oldest daughter is Alex Hoffman, a former beauty queen who has held the titles of Miss South Dakota Teen USA (2006) and Miss South Dakota (2008).  As Miss South Dakota, Alex placed in the top 15 of the 2009 Miss America pageant.  Alex, like her brother Austin, is also a broadcast journalist, best known for her work at KETV in Omaha.

Hoffman's youngest child and youngest daughter, Elizabeth Hoffman, also won the Miss South Dakota Teen USA pageant (2008), two years after her sister Alex won.

Survivor
After Hoffman's children had all gone off to college, she decided to pursue a new adventure in life, so she applied to be on the TV series Survivor.  In 2010, she was one of 20 people selected to compete on the show's 21st season, known as Survivor: Nicaragua.  That season, the tribes were initially divided according to age: the Espada tribe would consist of the ten older players in the game, and the La Flor tribe would be made up of the ten younger players.  The then-44-year-old Hoffman was initially placed on the Espada tribe.

Hoffman's first five days in the game were rough.  When she caught her tribemate Dan Lembo saying nasty things about her behind her back, she responded by taking his alligator shoes, filling them with sand, and leaving them in the ocean to sink.  Soon after, she became so distraught, that she seriously considered quitting the game, until fellow tribemate Jimmy Johnson convinced her to stay.  Ironically, Hoffman would be one of the castaways to vote off Johnson three days later.

On Day 28, Hoffman was on the winning team at the reward challenge, but she decided to give up her share of the reward in exchange for the whole tribe receiving a tarp and a can of rice, to replace the food and supplies lost in a fire a few days earlier.  That same day, two players, NaOnka Mixon and “Purple Kelly” Shinn, announced that were planning on quitting the game.  Hoffman, who had almost quit the game herself on Day Five, was now one of the castaways instrumental in trying to convince Shinn and Mixon to stay in the game.  The two of them would end up quitting anyway.

At the Final Four, Hoffman was aligned with Chase Rice and Matthew “Sash” Lenahan, and the three of them were planning on eliminating Jud “Fabio” Birza.  But when Birza won immunity, the three men, all of whom were original members of La Flor, joined together in sending Hoffman home as the seventeenth person eliminated from the season.  She would finish the game fourth place overall, as the ninth jury member, the last female standing, and the last original Espada member standing.  At the Final Tribal Council, she cast her vote for Rice to win the game, although Birza would end up winning the title of Sole Survivor.

At the reunion show, Hoffman made amends with Lembo, by giving him a pair of ostrich boots to replace the shoes which she had destroyed in Nicaragua.

Motivational speaking
After Survivor: Nicaragua aired, series host Jeff Probst commended Hoffman for her turnaround over the course of the game, saying that he had never seen anyone “do a 180” like that.  He also told her directly that she would do well as a public speaker.  Inspired, she started giving speeches in 2011, and soon after formed her own company, Inner Depth LLC, to market her motivational speaking skills.  In 2012, she wrote a book about her life experiences, entitled Your Winner Within.  The foreword was penned by her former Survivor tribemate, Jimmy Johnson.

Bibliography
Your Winner Within; Throne Publishing Group, 3rd Edition (2013) [original publication 2012], 
The Specialist: The Costa Rica Job (foreword): book written by Charles Peterson Sheppard; AuthorHouse (2013),

References

External links

1966 births
American motivational writers
Women motivational writers
American motivational speakers
Women motivational speakers
Living people
Northern State University alumni
People from Eureka, South Dakota
Survivor (American TV series) contestants